The Netivot railway station is a railway station situated in the western outskirts of Netivot, Israel. It is located on the Ashkelon–Beersheba railway between Sderot and Ofakim. A bus terminal is located adjacent to the station.

On the 12th of April 2011, the cornerstone of the station was laid in the presence of the Prime Minister, Binyamin Netanyahu and the Minister of Transportation, Yisrael Katz. Due to the 2014 Israel–Gaza conflict the original 2014 opening date was postponed to the 15th of February 2015.

References

External links

Railway stations in Southern District (Israel)
Railway stations opened in 2015
2015 establishments in Israel